Faraj Abdullah Saad Marzouk (born 1961) is a Qatari sprinter. He competed in the men's 100 metres at the 1984 Summer Olympics.

References

External links
 olympiandatabase

1961 births
Living people
Athletes (track and field) at the 1984 Summer Olympics
Qatari male sprinters
Olympic athletes of Qatar
Place of birth missing (living people)